The Boys is a 2022 South Korean detective drama film directed by Chung Ji-young and starring Sol Kyung-gu and Yoo Jun-sang. The film based on the true story of the 'Samrye Nara Super Incident' that occurred in Wanju County, depicts the story of re-investigation of the boys who were identified as the culprits of a robbery and murder case that occurred at a supermarket 'Woori Super' in a small town. It had its premiere at 'Korean Cinema Today - Special Premiere' section of 27th Busan International Film Festival on October 6, 2022.

Cast

 Sol Kyung-gu as Hwang Jun-cheol
 Jin Kyung as Yoon Mi-sook
 Yoo Jun-sang as Choi Woo-seong
 Heo Sung-tae as Detective Park
 Yeom Hye-ran as Kim Kyeong-mi
 Kim Dong-young
 Yoo Su-bin
 Kim Kyung-ho

Special appearance
 Cho Jin-woong
 Yang Min-hyeok

Production
On June 9, 2020 cast of the film was revealed. Sol Kyung-gu, Yoo Jun-sang, Jin Kyung, Heo Sung-tae and Yeom Hye-ran were cast in main roles.

Release
The film premiered at 'Korean Cinema Today - Special Premiere' section of 27th Busan International Film Festival on October 6, 2022.

References

External links
 
 
 

2022 films
2022 crime drama films
2020s Korean-language films
South Korean crime drama films
CJ Entertainment films
South Korean detective films
South Korean drama films
South Korean police films
South Korean films based on actual events